The Beginning Stages of... is the debut album from The Polyphonic Spree. The US re-release version of the album has both the original CD plus a bonus CD that features four alternate tracks and a music video for the single version of "Light and Day". The UK re-release is identical to the original release. The album is also available on gatefold vinyl.

Track listing
All songs written by Tim DeLaughter.
"Section 1 (Have a Day/Celebratory)" – 4:38
"Section 2 (It's the Sun)" – 5:33
"Section 3 (Days Like This Help Me Warm)" – 4:05
"Section 4 (La La)" – 2:10
"Section 5 (Middle of the Day)" – 2:45
"Section 6 (Hanging Around the Day Part 1)" – 2:37
"Section 7 (Hanging Around the Day Part 2)" – 2:39
"Section 8 (Soldier Girl)" – 3:59
"Section 9 (Light and Day/Reach for the Sun)" – 3:23
"Section 10 (A Long Day)" – 36:30

US re-release bonus disc
"Light and Day" (Single version) – 3:03
"Have a Day" (KCRW Morning Becomes Eclectic version) - 4:55
"It's the Sun" (KCRW Morning Becomes Eclectic version) – 5:33
"Soldier Girl" (UK Single version) - 2:23
"Light and Day" (Orchestral version) - 2:48
"Light and Day" (Music video, multimedia track)

UK double disc
Disc 1
"Section 1 (Have a Day/Celebratory)" – 4:38
"Section 2 (It's the Sun)" – 5:33
"Section 3 (Days Like This Help Me Warm)" – 4:05
"Section 4 (La La)" – 2:10
"Section 5 (Middle of the Day)" – 2:45
"Section 6 (Hanging Around the Day Part 1)" – 2:37
"Section 7 (Hanging Around the Day Part 2)" – 2:39
"Section 8 (Soldier Girl)" – 3:59
"Section 9 (Light and Day/Reach for the Sun)" – 3:23
"Section 10 (A Long Day)" – 1:45
"Soldier Girl" (Alternate Version) – 3:05
"Hanging Around" (Alternate Version) – 3:48
"Light and Day" (Alternate Version) – 3:05
"It's the Sun" (Alternate Version) – 4:22

Disc 2

See the Beginning Stages of... Live DVD, featuring "Light and Day", "Hanging Around", and "Soldier Girl", plus additional clips, When the Sound Went Down, backstage and onstage photo galleries.

Singles

CD
Soldier Girl E.P. (May 5, 2002)
Soldier Girl (2002 Album Version)
Sun (Section 2 from The Beginning Stages of...)
Soldier Girl
Soldier Girl (Radio Edit)
Soldier Girl (Section 8 from The Beginning Stages of...)
Hanging Around CD1 (Enhanced CD) (October 21, 2002)
Hanging Around
Five Years (Live at Maida Vale/Radio 1)
Fields (Live at Maida Vale/Radio 1)
Hanging Around [Multimedia Track]
Hanging Around CD2 (Enhanced CD) (October 21, 2002)
What We Will Be (Live at the Union Chapel, London)
Hanging Around (Live at the Union Chapel, London)
Soldier Girl (Live at the Union Chapel, London)
Light and Day CD1 (Enhanced CD) (February 10, 2003)
Light and Day (Single Version)
The March
Light and Day (The Bees Remix)
Light and Day CD2 (Enhanced CD) (February 10, 2003)
Light and Day (Live at the Shepards Bush Empire, London)
Have a Day (Live at the Shepards Bush Empire, London)
Days Like These Keep Me Warm (Live at the Shepards Bush Empire, London)
Light and Day [Multimedia Track]
Soldier Girl CD1 (July 14, 2003)
Soldier Girl (Single Version)
It's the Sun (New Version)
Soldier Girl (Death in Vegas Remix)
Light and Day EP (October, 2003)
Light and Day (Single Version)
The March
Soldier Girl (Stereolab Mix)

Vinyl
Hanging Around 7" Gatefold Vinyl (October 24, 2002)
Hanging Around
Five Years (Live at Maida Vale/Radio 1)
Light and Day 12" Vinyl (February 10, 2003)
Soldier Girl (RJD2 Instrumental)
Light and Day (Single Version)
The March (Symphonic Version)
Soldier Girl 7" Gatefold Vinyl (July 14, 2003)
Soldier Girl (Single Version)
It's the Sun (The Go! Team Remix)

DVD
Soldier Girl DVD (July 14, 2003)
Soldier Girl (Video)
Soldier Girl (Zongamin Remix)
Soldier Girl (Stereolab Remix)

Personnel

Todd Berridge – viola
Jessica Berridge – vocals
Jeff Bouck – percussion, car tailpipes, tablas, timpani, gong, vocals
Austen Brown – vocals
Joe Butcher-Sho-Bud – pedal steel, Moog Rogue, Korg N-5, egg shaker
Erik Courson – vocals
Chris Curiel – trumpet
Tim DeLaughter – lead vocals, guitar, keyboards
Julie Doyle – vocals
Audrey Easley – flute, piccolo
Ryan Fitzgerald – vocals, guitar
Toby Halbrooks – theremin
Jessie Hester – vocals, piano, keyboards
Even Hisey – keyboards
Ray Ivy – vocals
Carlos Jackson – Farfisa organ, bells, tambourine, vocals
Maria Jeffers – cello
Jennifer Jobe – vocals
Jessica Jordan – vocals
Logan Keese – trumpet, flugelhorn
Jennie Kelley – vocals
Stephen Kirkham – vocals
John Lamonica – vocals
Mark McKeever – keyboards, piano, Moog synthesizer, trumpet, vocals
Mike Melendi – percussion
Rick Nelson – viola, violin, upright bass, cello
Chris Penn – vocals
Mark Pirro – bass
Ricky Rasura – classical harp
James Reimer – trombone
Kelly Repka – vocals
Christy Stewart – vocals
Andrew Tinker – French horn
Michael Turner – vocals
Bryan Wakeland – drums, percussion

Charts

References

External links
The Beginning Stages of... official website - Contains liner notes and lyrics.

The Polyphonic Spree albums
2002 debut albums
Good Records albums
Hollywood Records albums